ispoof.cc was a website used by numerous people to mask phone numbers. In 2021 and 2022 it was part of an investigation by numerous law enforcement agencies into frauds enabled by caller ID spoofing. It was shut down in November 2022 as the result of Operation Elaborate, a multi-agency investigation led by the Metropolitan Police and supported by Netherlands Police, Europol and Eurojust. As of 2022, it is the largest fraud investigation that has ever taken place in the United Kingdom. 

The investigation began in June 2021, targeting a suspected organised crime group. The website allowed people to used caller ID spoofing to appear as if they were calling from legitimate bodies, which in turn enabled them to defraud victims - tricking them into handing over money, or providing sensitive information, such as banking passwords. Those behind the site are believed by police to have earned almost £3,200,000 in a single 20 months period. Globally, 142 people were arrested. Police are focussing first on UK users and those who have spent at least £100 of bitcoin on the site, as the total number of potential suspects is 59,000 - too many to deal with at the same time. In total, between August 2021 and August 2022, approximately 10,000,000 fraudulent calls were made via the website, with 3.5 million made in the UK.

There were at least 4,785 victims who reported the crime to Action Fraud, with the highest loss to an individual as £3,000,000. In the UK, 70,000 individual phone numbers were targeted, and the Metropolitan Police estimate there are 200,000 victims in the UK. The average loss of those victims identified by Action Fraud is £10,000. Europol estimated that there was an estimated worldwide loss to victims in excess of £100,000,000.

Action by country

Netherlands 
Netherlands Police came across iSpoof in an ongoing spoofing investigation. They discovered that the spoofing service was hosted on servers in The Netherlands. This resulted in a new investigation, completely focused on the service itself. Deconflicting with international partners turned out to be the start of a close collaboration with London’s Metropolitan Service which had their sights on the administrator residing in London. By means of a wiretap in Almere, the Netherlands Police gathered all calls made using the spoofing service. This resulted in insight into the users and how they work. Several forensic images of the server were taken over time and the databases were analyzed. Since then, several suspects have been identified and arrested in the Netherlands. The Dutch information about the criminal users has been shared with other countries making further investigations possible.

Republic of Ireland 
Six people were arrested in the Republic as part of the investigation. Seventeen locations across County Louth, County Meath and Dublin were searched, and 132 electronic devices seized. The Garda Síochána also identified 64 suspicious bank accounts. Detective Inspector Mel Smyth said that while the exact amount lost in the Republic of Ireland was unknown, it did run into the millions. He also explained that more searches and arrests would be carried out as the investigation unfolded.

Ukraine 
The Department of Cyber Police of the National Police of Ukraine were involved in the seizure of the website and server.

United Kingdom 
The investigation was led by London's Metropolitan Police, and assisted by multiple other agencies, including the City of London Police and the National Fraud Intelligence Bureau (known publicly as 'Action Fraud'). In the UK, as of 25 November 2022, 120 arrests had been made; with 103 in London and 17 outside London. The alleged site administrator, a 34 year old man, was arrested in East London on 6 November and is due to appear at Southwark Crown Court after the Crown Prosecution Service authorised charges against him.

United States 
Authorities from Ukraine and the USA seized the website and server, taking it offline on 8 November. The Federal Bureau of Investigation (Pittsburgh), United States Secret Service (Pittsburgh), and United States Attorney (Western Pennsylvania) were involved.

Other agencies 
The following other agencies were involved:

 Australian Federal Police (several suspects were identified in Australia)
 Royal Canadian Mounted Police (Federal Policing Cybercrime Investigation Team Toronto)
 The French 'Cyber Criminality Unit' of Paris, and the Gendarmerie National (several suspects were identified in France)
 The German Bundeskriminalamt
 Lithuanian Criminal Police Bureau
 Europol and Eurojust

Notes

References

Criminal investigation
Operations against organized crime
Metropolitan Police
Fraud in England
Cybercrime in the United Kingdom